Rubus laciniatus, the cutleaf evergreen blackberry or evergreen blackberry, is a species of Rubus, native to Eurasia. It is an introduced species in Australia and North America. It has become a weed and invasive species in forested habitats in the United States and Canada, particularly in the Northeast and along the Pacific Coast.

Description
Rubus laciniatus is a deciduous, bramble-forming shrub growing to 3 meters (10 feet) tall, with prickly shoots. The leaves are palmately compound, with five leaflets, each divided into deeply toothed subleaflets with jagged, thorny tips. The flowers have pink or white petals. Fruits are similar to the common blackberry, with a unique, fruitier flavour. The fruits are not true berries in the botanical sense.

The species is unusual in the genus in having 3-lobed petals and also in having such deeply divided leaves.

The fruits of this plant are eagerly consumed by a number of animal species, including many birds and mammals. The thickets provide valuable cover for animals.

Cultivation

Several commercially important berry cultivars have been bred from this wild Rubus laciniatus species, which has been grown for its fruits since 1770.

References

External links

 Plants of British Columbia: Rubus laciniatus
 
 
 
 University of Washington, Seattle, Burke Museum
 photo of herbarium specimen at Missouri Botanical Garden
 
 

laciniatus
Flora of Europe
Plants described in 1806
Berries